Dundee is a village in Monroe County in the U.S. state of Michigan. The population was 5,323 at the 2020 census.  The village is within Dundee Township and is served by Dundee Community Schools.  

Settled as early as 1823, Dundee was incorporated as a village in 1855.  The downtown Dundee Historic District is listed on the National Register of Historic Places, which also includes the Old Mill Museum and the Macon Reservation of the River Raisin National Battlefield Park. The village is nicknamed the "Hub of the Highways" due to the intersection of major historic thoroughfares at the village's center (specifically present-day M-50 and U.S. Route 23).

Geography
Dundee is the largest village by land area in the state of Michigan.

Climate

According to the Köppen Climate Classification system, Dundee has a hot-summer humid continental climate, abbreviated "Dfa" on climate maps.

Major highways

Demographics

2010 census
As of the census of 2010, there were 3,957 people, 1,539 households, and 1,035 families living in the village. The racial makeup of the village was 96.5% White, 0.9% African American, 0.4% Native American, 0.5% Asian, 0.5% from other races, and 1.2% from two or more races. Hispanic or Latino of any race were 2.6% of the population.

There were 1,539 households, of which 36.5% had children under the age of 18 living with them, 50.5% were married couples living together, 12.7% had a female householder with no husband present, 4.0% had a male householder with no wife present, and 32.7% were non-families. 27.5% of all households were made up of individuals, and 11.1% had someone living alone who was 65 years of age or older. The average household size was 2.55 and the average family size was 3.14.

The median age in the village was 34.3 years. 27% of residents were under the age of 18; 8% were between the ages of 18 and 24; 30.1% were from 25 to 44; 23.9% were from 45 to 64; and 11.2% were 65 years of age or older. The gender makeup of the village was 48.1% male and 51.9% female.

2000 census
As of the census of 2000, there were 3,522 people, 1,389 households, and 913 families living in the village. The racial makeup of the village was 96.91% White, 0.65% African American, 0.40% Native American, 0.40% Asian, 0.23% from other races, and 1.42% from two or more races. Hispanic or Latino of any race were 1.19% of the population.

There were 1,389 households, out of which 35.3% had children under the age of 18 living with them, 47.6% were married couples living together, 12.7% had a female householder with no husband present, and 34.2% were non-families. 28.5% of all households were made up of individuals, and 11.4% had someone living alone who was 65 years of age or older.  The average household size was 2.53 and the average family size was 3.10.

In the village, the age distribution of the population was as follows: 28.9% were under the age of 18, 10.9% from 18 to 24, 32.2% from 25 to 44, 17.7% from 45 to 64, and 10.2% who were 65 years of age or older.  The median age was 31 years. For every 100 females, there were 93.6 males.  For every 100 females age 18 and over, there were 90.8 males.

The median income for a household in the village was $41,563, and the median income for a family was $49,479. Males had a median income of $40,612 versus $24,908 for females. The per capita income for the village was $18,389.  About 5.5% of families and 9.0% of the population were below the poverty line, including 11.0% of those under age 18 and 2.6% of those age 65 or over.

Notable people
Catharine Hitchcock Tilden Avery, author and educator who was born in Dundee
Joel Dean, founder of Dean & DeLuca.

Gallery

References

External links
Official website

Villages in Monroe County, Michigan
Villages in Michigan
Populated places established in 1823
1823 establishments in Michigan Territory